KIMM (1150 AM, "FOX Sports Rapid City") is an American radio station that broadcasts a sports format with programming from FOX Sports Radio. KIMM-AM also broadcasts on FM translator K294BT-FM 106.7 MHz.
Licensed to Rapid City, South Dakota, the station primarily serves the Rapid City and western South Dakota area. The station is currently owned by Black Hills Broadcasting, L.L.C.

KIMM used to air a mix of various syndicated conservative talk radio shows like Don Imus, Glenn Beck, Dave Ramsey, Michael Savage, Mark Levin, and Tom Sullivan. Weekend programming included a mix of sports and lifestyle programs.

On October 30, 2017, following an agreement for the sale of the station, KIMM changed their format from news/political talk to sports talk and rebranded as "FOX Sports Rapid City".

Ownership
In May 1999, Triad Broadcasting reached a deal to acquire this station from Brothers Jim and Tom Instad as part of a twelve-station deal valued at a reported $37.8 million.

This station is now owned by Nate Brown, host of 'The Nate Brown Show,' through licensee Black Hills Broadcasting, L.L.C.

The Nate Brown Show 

On March 13, 2017, 'The Nate Brown Show' went live with local host Nate Brown on KIMM. The 2-hour local sports talk show was on weekdays from 2 P.M. to 4 P.M., showcasing national, regional, and local sports guests and stories to the Black Hills region. It became Rapid City's and western South Dakota's first and only local sports talk show serving a population of over 216,000.

In November 2017, the show switched its time slot on weekdays to 4 P.M. to 6 P.M. It is still the area's only live and local sports talk show exclusively heard on KIMM (FOX Sports Rapid City). 'The Nate Brown Show' has since expanded their listenership across the state of South Dakota and rebranded its slogan to "South Dakota's Sports Talk Show."

To date, 'The Nate Brown Show' has done over 1,000 shows with over 150,000 podcast listens. It has since added a live video stream of the show to better broaden its brand and reach.

Previous station logo(s)

References

External links

The Nate Brown Show on Twitter
The Nate Brown Show on SoundCloud
The Nate Brown Show on YouTube

IMM (AM)
Sports radio stations in the United States
Fox Sports Radio stations
Radio stations established in 1962
1962 establishments in South Dakota